The Dubai International Food Safety Conference (DIFSC) is an annual conference organized by the Dubai Municipality, in conjunction with the Gulfood Exhibition, held at the Dubai International Convention Centre in Dubai, United Arab Emirates.

Aim

The conference aims at providing delegates with a good understanding of current food safety issues, Food Safety Management Techniques and the best practices followed in the food industry. The main objective of the conference is to act as a platform to resolve food safety issues in the Gulf Co-operation Council region and provide opportunities for students to learn about food safety.

1st DIFSC (2006)

The 1st Dubai International Food Safety Conference was introduced during the Gulfood Exhibition 2006, as part of the Dubai Municipality's Strategic Plan, which called for enhancing the public's health through ensuring food safety. As food safety requires inputs from all concerned parties, the Food Control Section of Dubai Municipality teamed up with many international, regional, and local bodies in order to organize a conference that would serve as a forum for discussing issues related to the safety of food.

The three-day conference attracted more than 250 delegates from different sectors of the food industry as well as international, regional and local food control entities.

2nd DIFSC (2007)
The second conference was held during February 20–22, 2007 and was themed "Latest Trends in Food Safety and Risk Assessment".

The conference featured speakers representing food control authorities, International Organizations such as the World Health Organization (WHO), the Codex Alimentarius Commission, academic and scientific circles, food manufacturing and trading companies and many other entities which are concerned with the safety of food.

Food Risk Assessment was discussed in light of the following elements:

 Food safety laws and regulations 
 Food safety systems 
 Best practices in food safety

3rd DIFSC (2008)
The 3rd conference was held from February 24–27, 2008.

A unique feature of the conference was the Tackle the Issue program, which aimed to bring the food industry personnel and food regulatory authorities from all the GCC countries together on one platform to look at possible solutions for problems faced by the food industry.

See also 
 Food safety

References

External links
Official website of the conference 

Recurring events established in 2006
International Food Safety Conference
Food safety
International conferences in the United Arab Emirates
Annual events in the United Arab Emirates
2006 establishments in the United Arab Emirates
Trade fairs in the United Arab Emirates